Herbert Hawley Harwood Jr. (born February 6, 1931) is an American author. He has published many books, all of which are on the subject of railroad history.

Published works

References

External links
 

 

 

1931 births
Living people
20th-century American historians
American male non-fiction writers
Rail transport writers
Railway historians
20th-century American male writers